Claghorn and Cunningham Range is a historic range of buildings in Savannah, Georgia, United States. Located in Savannah's Historic District, the addresses of some of the properties are East Bay Street, above Factors Walk, while others solely utilize the former King Cotton warehouses on River Street. As of February 2022, the businesses occupying the ground floor of the River Street elevation are True Grits and Wet Willie's.

The building's construction, completed in 1857 in tandem with the adjacent (to the east) Jones and Derenne Range, is attributed to Charles Sholl and Calvin Fay. Savannah Cotton Exchange, adjacent to the west, was built in 1887, thirty years after the Claghorn and Cunningham Range.

During the Civil War, Claghorn and Cunningham was a chandlery.

In 1887, Claghorn and Cunningham, wholesalers, wrote a letter of reference in a Yulee vs. Canova lawsuit in the Supreme Court of Florida:

River Street façade

See also
Buildings in Savannah Historic District

References

Commercial buildings in Savannah
Commercial buildings completed in 1858
Savannah Historic District